Level 2 is the second full-length album by metal band, Last Chance to Reason. It was released in 2011 through Prosthetic Records and is their first release since leaving Tribunal.

Background
Teaming up with producer Jamie King (Between the Buried and Me, The Human Abstract), the band set out to create a modern take on the classic progressive concept album. Drawing influence from the 1970s prog of King Crimson and Yes, composers Steve Reich and Schoenberg as well as prog-metal masters Opeth, Dream Theater, Between the Buried and Me and Cynic, LCTR's Level 2 takes the band in awe-inspiring new directions.

Set in a Tron-like virtual world, the album's concept revolves around the relationship between man and technology, our move from physical reality to virtual spaces and what these changes mean to our lives and our art. The lyrics are expressed from the point of view of an artificial intelligence facing the violent reality of a videogame world.

Not content to simply release the piece as a musical endeavor, LCTR has teamed up with acclaimed indie developer Tom Vine and pixel artist Francis Coulombe to create a fully interactive version of the album in which the story unfolds through LCTR's thematic riffs, stirring vocal hooks and progressive virtuosity while the player blasts his way through viscous gameplay inspired by classics such as R-Type, Contra, and Super Metroid. However, there has only been a demo released so far, which is the full level of “Upload Complete".

Track listing

Personnel 
Last Chance to Reason
 Michael Lessard – vocals
 AJ Harvey – guitar
 Evan Haines – guitar
 Chris Corey – bass
 Brian Palmer – keyboards
 Evan Sammons - drums

Production
Jamie King - producer

References

2011 albums
Last Chance to Reason albums
Prosthetic Records albums
Concept albums
Albums produced by Jamie King (record producer)